David Donachie (born 1944) is a Scottish nautical historical novelist. He also writes under the pen-names Tom Connery and Jack Ludlow as well as, from 2019, "Jack Cole".

He was elected to the Management Committee of the Society of Authors in 2014 and became chair in March 2016.

Personal life
Born in Edinburgh, Donachie now lives in Deal, Kent, with his novelist wife Sarah Grazebrook.

Series
, there were 27 books published under his own name and 20 under his pen-names.  He is best known for his seafaring novels.

The Privateersman Mysteries
 The Devil's Own Luck (1991)
 The Dying Trade (1993)
 A Hanging Matter (1994) 
 An Element of Chance (1995)
 The Scent of Betrayal (1996)
 A Game of Bones (1997)

The Markham of the Marines Series (writing as Tom Connery)
 A Shred of Honour (1996)
 Honour Redeemed (1997)
 Honour Be Damned (1999)

Nelson and Emma
 On a Making Tide (2000)
 Tested by Fate (2001)
 Nelson: Breaking the Line (2001)

The John Pearce Series
 By the Mast Divided (2004)
 A Shot Rolling Ship (2005)
 An Awkward Commission (2006)
 Flag of Truce (2008), his most widely held book; according to WorldCat, the book is held in 402 libraries 
 The Admirals' Game (2008)
 An Ill Wind (2009)
 Blown off Course (2011)
  Enemies at Every Turn (2011)
  A Sea of Troubles (2012)
  A Divided Command (2013)
  The Devil to Pay (2014)
 The Perils of Command (2015)
 "A Treacherous Coast" (2016)
 "On a particular service (2017)
 "A close run thing" (2018)
 "HMS Hazard" (2021)

The Contraband Shore Series
 The Contraband Shore (2018)
 A Lawless Place (2019)
 Blood Will Out (2019)

As Jack Cole
 Every Second Counts
 Tight Lies

The Republic Series (writing as Jack Ludlow)
 The Pillars of Rome (2007)
 The Sword of Revenge (2008)
 The Gods of War (2008)

The Crusades Trilogy (writing as Jack Ludlow)

 Son of Blood (2012)
 Soldier of Crusade (2012)
 Prince of Legend (2013)

The Conquest Series (writing as Jack Ludlow)
 Mercenaries
 Warriors
 Conquest
 Hawkwood

The Last Roman Trilogy (writing as Jack Ludlow) 
 Vengeance (2014)
 Honour (2014)
 Triumph (2015)

References

 

1944 births
Living people
British historical novelists
20th-century British novelists
21st-century British novelists
Nautical historical novelists
Writers of historical mysteries
British male novelists
20th-century British male writers
21st-century British male writers